Star is an American drama television series created by Lee Daniels and Tom Donaghy. The series follows three young women who navigate the music business on their road to success. The series debuted on December 14, 2016 on Fox and was renewed for a second season in February 2017. The second season debuted on September 27, 2017. On May 10, 2018, Fox renewed the show for a third season, which premiered on September 26, 2018.

Series overview

Episodes

Season 1 (2016–17)

Season 2 (2017–18)

Season 3 (2018–19)

Ratings

Season 1

Season 2

Season 3

References

External links

Lists of American drama television series episodes